Fariman (also Romanized as Farīmān) is a village in Ruin Rural District, in the Central District of Esfarayen County, North Khorasan Province, Iran. At the 2006 census, its population was 853, in 187 families.

References 

Populated places in Esfarayen County